The 2007 Australian Football League draft consisted of four opportunities for player acquisitions during the 2007/08 Australian Football League off-season. These were trade week, the national draft, which was held on 24 November 2007, the pre-season draft and the rookie draft.

Player movements

Trades 
2007 was the first year that clubs were allowed to trade picks without the trade involving a player.

Retirements and delistings
The 2007 AFL season is notable for the unusually large number of players who retired, particularly senior and "champion" players.

2007 national draft

2008 pre-season draft

2008 rookie draft

Draft firsts
This draft has been the first ever draft where elevated NSW scholarship players (Taylor Walker, Craig Bird, Ryan Davis, James Wilsen, Khan Haretuku) were drafted to their respective clubs by the draft under the rule, clubs must give up their last selection in either rookie or senior draft in order to draft that elevated scholarship player.

Selections by league
National and Pre-season draft selection totals by leagues:

Notes

References

External links 

Australian Football League draft
Draft
AFL draft